John Thomas Ball (born May 10, 1990) is an American Christian musician and guitarist, who plays alternative rock, folk rock, indie folk and indie rock music. He has released three extended plays, Found Among the Broken (2010), John Ball (2013), and By Declaration & the Death (2016).

Early and personal life
John Thomas Ball was born on May 10, 1990, in Birmingham, Alabama, where he graduated from Oak Mountain High School in 2008. He received his baccalaureate degree majoring in music business from Belmont University in 2011. Ball is currently in the process of obtaining his master's degree in theology from Liberty University.

Music history
His music career began in 2009, with the band, The Sleep Design, where he is the bassist. He released a solo extended play, Found Among the Broken, on November 16, 2010. The subsequent extended play, John Ball, was released on May 21, 2013. His third extended play, By Declaration & the Death, was released on February 12, 2016.

Discography
EPs
 Found Among the Broken (November 16, 2010)
 John Ball (October 2, 2013)
 By Declaration & the Death (February 12, 2016)

References

External links
 

1990 births
American performers of Christian music
Belmont University alumni
Living people
Musicians from Birmingham, Alabama
Songwriters from Alabama
21st-century American male singers
21st-century American singers
American male songwriters